Debenhams.com Online Limited, trading as Debenhams.com, is an online retailer owned by Boohoo.com. The company was formed in 2021 after Boohoo purchased the website operations and rights to the name of the department store group Debenhams, which had entered liquidation.

Boohoo purchased the name and associated website operations from the administrators of Debenhams for £55 million in January 2021. On 12 April 2021, Boohoo relaunched the Debenhams website with a new full range of products and brands, mostly brands owned by Boohoo. Debenhams' remaining stores continued to trade separately to the website operation until their closure in May that year.

On 16 June 2021, Boohoo's Group Chief Executive John Lyttle told The Times that some beauty brands had refused to supply products to Debenhams unless it had a physical store presence, thus Boohoo planned to open one Debenhams-branded beauty store outside London.

In December 2021, Debenhams.com Beauty opened in the Manchester Arndale shopping centre, a 7552sq ft two floor physical store operated by Boohoo Group in their home city. The store was launched to meet a number of contractual deals with brands Boohoo stocks and as a rival to Next's beauty halls and Harrods' H Beauty chain. No further physical stores are expected to be opened.

References

Online retailers of the United Kingdom
Companies based in Manchester
British companies established in 2021